Dobrić is a village in Serbia. It is situated in the Šabac municipality, in the Mačva District. The village has a Serb ethnic majority and its population numbering 1,205 people (2002 census). The Church of Saints Peter and Paul stands in the town.

See also
List of places in Serbia
Mačva

Mačva
Populated places in Mačva District